Punkt is a studio album by Canadian Québécois Pierre Lapointe, released by Audiogram on 26 February 2013. The album was long listed for the 2013 Polaris Music Prize.

Track listing

 La sexualité
 L’étrange route des amoureux
 Monsieur
 Plus vite que ton corps
 Des maux sur tout
 Tu es seul et resteras seul
 Nos joies répétitives
 Les remords ont faim
 Les délicieux amants
 Nu devant moi
 La date, l’heure, le moment
 N2o
 Gaetano Pesce
 Les ministère
 Barbara
 Les enfants du diable

Reception
The Gazette (Montreal) Bernard Perusse awarded the album 3.5 out of 5 stars.

References

2013 albums
Audiogram (label) albums
Pierre Lapointe albums